Kaheh (also Romanized as Kahah; also known as Kaha) is a village in Dar Agah Rural District, in the Central District of Hajjiabad County, Hormozgan Province, Iran. At the 2006 census, its population was 245, in 64 families.

References 

Populated places in Hajjiabad County